Grande Île or Grande-Île can mean:
 Grande Île, Strasbourg, in France
 Grande-Île, Normandy, in France
 Grande-Île, Quebec, in Canada
 la Grande île, one of the islands of the Archipelago of Saint-Pierre Lake, in Canada
 la Grande île, a French nickname for Madagascar

See also 
 Grand Isle (disambiguation)
 Grand Island (disambiguation)